Veliko Črnelo is a small settlement south of Ivančna Gorica in the historical region of Lower Carniola in  Slovenia. The area is part of the Central Slovenia Statistical Region.

References

External links
Veliko Črnelo on Geopedia

Populated places in the Municipality of Ivančna Gorica